Irma Dolores Player Hall (born June 3, 1935) is an American actress who has appeared in films and television shows since the early 1970s. Hall often played matriarchal figures in films including A Family Thing, The Ladykillers and Soul Food, in which she portrayed Josephine "Big Mama Joe" Joseph, a role she reprised in the television series of the same name. Hall earned an NAACP Image Award for portraying the character in the film version.

She also appeared in Collateral and two films by director Werner Herzog. For her performance in The Ladykillers, she won the Jury Prize at the 2004 Cannes Film Festival.

Early life
Hall was born Irma Dolores Player Hall in Beaumont, Texas on June 3, 1935, the only child of Samuel Player, a saxophone player for the Rhumboogie Café, and Josephine Hall, who worked as an admission clerk at a hospital. She and her parents moved to Chicago's South Side in 1942, as Hall's parents wanted their daughter to have better opportunities in education. Hall attended Briar Cliff College in Sioux City, Iowa, but transferred at Texas College where she graduated.

Beginning in 1962, she taught French, Spanish, and other languages at Booker T. Washington High School and James Madison High School. Hall continued to teach until she began acting full time in 1984.

Career
Hall's first acting role was Georgia Brown in an independent film, Book of Numbers, at the age of 37. Actor/director Raymond St. Jacques hired her as an interim publicist for the film. He saw her performing at a poetry reading and liked her so much that he offered her a role on the spot. St. Jacques opined Hall was a natural and that she should act professionally. She discovered a love for acting, and soon co-founded a repertory theatre in Dallas.

She worked steadily in films and TV throughout the 1980s, and appeared in the films Backdraft (1991) and Mo' Money (1992). However, Hall remained relatively unknown until her role as the loving Aunt T. in 1996's A Family Thing. Multiple critics believed Hall stole every scene she was in. She won the Chicago Film Critics Association Award and the Kansas City Film Critics Circle Award for Best Supporting Actress for her role, and the success of that film helped establish her as a major supporting actress in the late 1990s and early 2000s.

Sizable roles in major films such as Nothing to Lose and Steel followed. Hall then landed the role of Big Mama Joseph in the film Soul Food. A film reviewer claimed Hall was "perfectly cast" in the role of Mama Joseph. For her work in this film, she received the NAACP Image Award for Outstanding Supporting Actress in a Motion Picture in 1998. Soul Food was a hit at the box office, prompting a television spinoff, Soul Food: The Series, in which Hall reprised her role in fantasy sequences. In 2001, Hall received a second NAACP Image Award nomination, in the category of Outstanding Supporting Actress in a Drama Series for playing Mama Joseph.

Also in 1997, she acted in the Clint Eastwood-directed film adaptation of John Berendt's novel Midnight in the Garden of Good and Evil. Her character,  root doctor Minerva, was based on Valerie Boles. Hall appeared in the television films A Lesson Before Dying (1999), Something to Sing About (2000), and Miss Lettie and Me (2002). Hall portrayed Glory St. Clair, a psychic nurse, in the short-lived series All Souls.

Hall landed another acclaimed role in the 2004 remake of The Ladykillers as Marva Munson, a religious landlady. A reviewer believed Hall was "outstanding" in the film, while Justin Flowers felt Hall was the funniest actor in an otherwise negative review for the film. She won a special Jury Prize at the 2004 Cannes Film Festival for her performance. Additionally, Hall received an NAACP Image Award nomination as Marva Munson.

She made guest appearances on Law & Order: Special Victims Unit, The Game, and Chicago Fire. Hall portrayed a day care operator in Meet the Browns (2008), also having a minor role in Bad Lieutenant: Port of Call New Orleans (2009). Hall appeared as an employee for a white family in Jayne Mansfield's Car (2012) and recurred as Meemaw in Hap and Leonard in 2017.

Personal life 
Hall lives in Dallas with her family. She has two children and four grandchildren.

She is a practicing Catholic.

Car accident
Shortly before the film release of The Ladykillers, Hall was seriously injured in a car accident in Chicago. In the midst of a snowstorm, she lost control of her vehicle, crossed lanes into oncoming traffic, and hit another car head on.

She underwent emergency open-heart surgery for a puncture wound to her aorta caused by a broken rib. In addition, Hall also suffered a shattered ankle and a broken arm. Hall was cited for driving with a suspended license, and not staying in her lane. She made a full recovery, and was able to continue her career.

Filmography

Film

Television

Awards and nominations
Academy of Science Fiction, Fantasy & Horror Films
2005, Best Actress: The Ladykillers (Nominated)
Black Reel Awards
2005, Best Actress in a Musical/Comedy: The Ladykillers (Winner)
2000, Best Supporting Actress in a Mini-Series/Television Movie: A Lesson Before Dying (Nominated)
2005, Jury Prize for Acting, Cannes Film Festival: The Ladykillers

References

External links
 

Living people
African-American poets
American poets
People from Beaumont, Texas
Actresses from Chicago
African-American actresses
American television actresses
American film actresses
American voice actresses
American stage actresses
American women poets
American women dramatists and playwrights
21st-century African-American people
21st-century African-American women
20th-century African-American people
20th-century African-American women
African-American women writers
1935 births